was the first official chorography of the Ryukyu Kingdom. It was compiled in 1713 under the King Shō Kei's order. 

This book was largely written in Japanese. Later  wrote its Kanbun translated version and titled it .

See also
Ryūkyū Shintō-ki

References

Ryukyu Kingdom
Religion in the Ryukyu Islands
1713 books